The 1942 San Jose State Spartans football team represented San Jose State College during the 1942 college football season.

San Jose State competed in the California Collegiate Athletic Association. The team was led by head coach Samuel Glenn "Tiny" Hartranft, in his first year, and they played home games at Spartan Stadium in San Jose, California. They finished the season with a record of seven wins and two losses (7–2, 1–1 CCAA).

Note that many colleges did not play football during World War II. Santa Barbara College, another member of the CCAA, missed the 1942 season leaving the CCAA with just three teams for the 1942 season. From 1943 to 1945 San Jose State did not field a team.

Schedule

Team players in the NFL
The following San Jose State players were selected in the 1946 NFL Draft.

The following player ended his San Jose State career in 1942, was not drafted, but played in the NFL.

Notes

References

San Jose State
San Jose State Spartans football seasons
San Jose State Spartans football